Wind Mountain is a  mountain summit located in Kananaskis Country in the Canadian Rockies of Alberta, Canada.  Wind Mountain's nearest higher peak is Mount Galatea,  to the south, and both are part of the Kananaskis Range. Wind Mountain can be seen from the Trans-Canada Highway in the Bow River valley, and from Highway 40.

History

Wind Mountain was a massif with four peaks when originally named by Eugene Bourgeau of the Palliser Expedition in 1858, but three of the four peaks were renamed Mount Lougheed in 1928 after Sir James Lougheed's family pressured the government to name the peak in honor of him following his death. The present day Wind Mountain (highest of the four) was later named in 1983 to honor Bourgeau's original naming. Bourgeau so named the mountain because clouds were gathering and curling around its high peaks.

The mountain's name was officially adopted in 1985 by the Geographical Names Board of Canada.

Geology

Wind Mountain is composed of sedimentary rock laid down during the Precambrian to Jurassic periods. Formed in shallow seas, this sedimentary rock was pushed east and over the top of younger rock during the Laramide orogeny.

Climate

Based on the Köppen climate classification, Wind Mountain is located in a subarctic climate with cold, snowy winters, and mild summers. Temperatures can drop below −20 °C with wind chill factors below −30 °C in winter. The months July through September offer the most favorable weather for viewing and climbing this mountain. Precipitation runoff from the mountain drains into tributaries of the Bow River.

See also

Mountains of Alberta
Geography of Alberta
List of mountains of Canada
Geology of Alberta

References

External links
 Weather forecast: Wind Mountain

Three-thousanders of Alberta
Canadian Rockies
Alberta's Rockies